cGMP-dependent protein kinase 1, alpha isozyme is an enzyme that in humans is encoded by the PRKG1 gene.

Interactions 

PRKG1 has been shown to interact with:

 GTF2I,
 ITPR1, 
 MRVI1, 
 RGS2,  and
 TNNT1.

References

Further reading 

 
 
 
 
 
 
 
 
 
 
 
 
 
 
 
 
 
 

EC 2.7.11